Ricardo Balderas Orozco (born March 3, 1993 in Monterrey, Nuevo León), known as Ricardo Balderas, is a Mexican professional association football (soccer) player who plays for Atlético Veracruz.

References

Liga MX players
Living people
Mexican footballers
1993 births
Sportspeople from Monterrey
Association football defenders